Antoine Chidiac (born 13 November 1952) is a Lebanese judoka. He competed in the men's half-heavyweight event at the 1972 Summer Olympics.

References

1952 births
Living people
Lebanese male judoka
Olympic judoka of Lebanon
Judoka at the 1972 Summer Olympics
Place of birth missing (living people)